Arnošt Hájek (born 19 April 1941) is a Czech biathlete. He competed in the 20 km individual event at the 1972 Winter Olympics.

References

1941 births
Living people
Czech male biathletes
Olympic biathletes of Czechoslovakia
Biathletes at the 1972 Winter Olympics